Shri Motilal Verma was a great Indian Freedom Fighter and a Patriot. Even though he belonged to a wealthy and a respectable family of Katni, born in 1906 at Katni District of Madhya Pradesh, Shri Motilal was never attracted towards money and power. He was a wrestler and was very fond of visiting Akhadas (traditional Indian gymnasiums). But, after watching India in the shackles of slavery, he decided to throw himself up whole heartedly in India's struggle for freedom.

Contribution in India's struggle for freedom 

In 1930, at the call of Mahatma Gandhi, he took part in the Jungle Satyagraha. As a consequence, he underwent 6 months rigorous imprisonment. British Raj confiscated all his and his family’s movable and immovable property. There was a time when his home used to be filled with bags of money and jewels. But, he sacrificed everything for his country in the freedom struggle. After a long struggle, somehow he was able to repurchase his 200-year-old ancestral house.

He again took an active part in the 1942 Quit India Movement and suffered an 8-month-long jail sentence. This time also the British confiscated all his leftover property and belongings. He was not able to recover this time. As a result, he spent rest of his life working as an ordinary destitute clerk in small business establishments. But, even after this, he never lost his self-respect and never bowed his head to anyone.

He also had the privilege of working with the Great Indian Revolutionary Chandrashekhar Azad. In 1928, Shri Motilal helped Azad escape the eyes of the police while going to Allahabad from Jhansi. He once again met Chandra Shekhar near Allahabad on the banks of River Ganga where Azad was sharpening his infallible aim by shooting moving fishes in the water.

Later part of his life 

In this manner, Shri Motilal, both as a Gandhian and as a Revolutionary, gave his contribution to the Indian Freedom Struggle and served his nation. He never expected anything in return. He never wanted any political gains for his noble deeds. In 1935, Dr. Rajendra Prasad also visited his home who later on became the First President of Independent India. Since 1962, Shri Motilal kept receiving Freedom Fighter’s Pension from the State government and the Central Government. He was a very simple and honest person. He never relied on anyone and at the same time, he never lost his self-respect. He died in 1993 at Katni District of Madhya Pradesh.

Inspiration 

His grandson, Shri Anil Verma, is a renowned writer on Indian revolutionaries. He drew a lot of inspiration from Shri Motilal Verma. Shri Motilal's life and his ideals inspired and enabled him to write various books on Indian Revolutionaries such as Rajguru, Batukeshwar Dutt, Jagrani Devi etc.

References 

1906 births
1993 deaths
Gandhians
Indian revolutionaries